Bernie Arbour Memorial Stadium is a stadium on Upper Kenilworth Avenue in Hamilton, Ontario, Canada. Located in Mohawk Sports Park, it is primarily used for baseball and was once the home of the minor league Hamilton Redbirds of the New York–Penn League. Built in 1970 when Civic Stadium was renovated to football only, it is named for former Hamilton Police Sergeant Bernie Arbour, who was the director of the Hamilton Police Minor Athletic Association from 1948 to his death in 1967.

The Stadium is currently the home of the Hamilton Cardinals of the Intercounty Baseball League the Hamilton Angels of the Golden Horseshoe Baseball League and the Marauders. The ballpark has a capacity of 3,000 people.

Bernie Arbour Stadium dimensions are 300 feet down the left field line, 325 down right field, 365 to left-center, 405 to straight-away center and 365 to the power alley in right-center. The main grandstand accommodates upwards of 300 spectators and another 1,000 + spectators can be seated in the first and third base bleachers. The Press Box, seats up to 10 members of the media and is capable of supporting radio and television broadcasts.

Images

References

External links
 Hamilton Thunderbirds Lease Agreement for Bernie Arbour Stadium

Baseball venues in Ontario
Sports venues in Hamilton, Ontario
Minor league baseball venues